was a Japanese independent animator. From 1965 until his death he completed at least 37 short subject films in a wide variety of mediums, many of them winning award-winning, his honorific nicknamed "Sheldon Cohen and Hans Fischerkoesen of Japan".

Career and legacy 
Eight of his films have been awarded the Ōfuji Noburō Award at the Mainichi Film Awards (more than any other director in the history of the prize) and his films have altogether earned at least 24 other awards internationally.

After working at MOM Productions, known for its stop motion work for Rankin/Bass, he founded his own production company, Echo Incorporated, in 1964, and soon after made a trip to visit Czech animator and director Břetislav Pojar. One of his last films, was commissioned and broadcast across the nation by NHK, the national public broadcasting organization of Japan, as one of their Minna no Uta interstitial programs. Posthumously completed under the supervision of Kihachirō Kawamoto, it débuted in 1991 and was awarded with, amongst others, that year's Ōfuji Noburō and Minister of Education prizes (the latter being an NHK Japan Prize for achievement in an audiovisual work relevant to primary education) and prompted a special lifetime achievement Mainichi Film Award for Okamoto.

Home media
A selection of Okamoto's films was released on Laserdisc on August 24, 1986 and re-released on September 25, 1994. A more complete collection was released across three DVD-Video discs on June 24, 2009: these were available separately or as a box set, exclusive to which there was a fourth disc of additional materials such as university and advertising work.

Filmography 

 Fushigi na Kusuri (ふしぎなくすり, The Mysterious Medicine, 1965)
 Kitsutsuki Keikaku (キツツキ計画, The Woodpecker Plan, 1966)
 Hana to Mogura (花ともぐら, 1970)
 12-gatsu no uta (12月のうた, December Song, 1971)
 Chikotan (チコタン, 1971)
 Nanmu Ichibyō Sokusai (南無一病息災, 1973)
 Mizu no Tane (水のたね, 1975)
 Frypan Jiisan (ふらいぱんじいさん, 1981)
 Metropolitan Museum (メトロポリタンミュージアム, 1984)
 Chūmon no Ōi Ryōriten (注文の多い料理店, The Restaurant of Many Orders, 1993), based on Kenji Miyazawa

See also
 Tadahito Mochinaga
 Nihon University
 Karel Zeman

References

External links
 Tadanari Okamoto at Anido Web Page
 
 

Anime directors
Japanese animators
Japanese film directors
Japanese film producers
Japanese animated film directors
Japanese animated film producers
1932 births
People from Toyonaka, Osaka
1990 deaths
Osaka University alumni